Streptomyces atrovirens is a bacterium species from the genus Streptomyces which was isolated from soil in Egypt. Streptomyces atrovirens produces indole-3-acetic acid.

See also 
 List of Streptomyces species

References

Further reading

External links
Type strain of Streptomyces atrovirens at BacDive -  the Bacterial Diversity Metadatabase

atrovirens
Bacteria described in 1986